The 1912 United States presidential election in Idaho took place on November 5, 1912, as part of the 1912 United States presidential election. State voters chose four representatives, or electors, to the Electoral College, who voted for president and vice president.

Idaho was won by New Jersey Governor Woodrow Wilson (D–Virginia), running with Indiana Governor Thomas R. Marshall, with 32.08 percent of the popular vote, against the 27th president of the United States William Howard Taft (R–Ohio), running with Columbia University President Nicholas Murray Butler, with 31.02 percent of the popular vote, the 26th president of the United States Theodore Roosevelt (P–New York), running with governor of California Hiram Johnson, with 24.14 percent of the popular vote and the five-time candidate of the Socialist Party of America for President of the United States Eugene V. Debs (S–Indiana), running with the first Socialist mayor of a major city in the United States Emil Seidel, with 11.31 percent of the popular vote.

Wilson's 32.08% of the popular vote is the smallest vote share by which any candidate has carried a state in any United States presidential election; slightly smaller than John Quincy Adams' 32.46% in Illinois in 1824, and Abraham Lincoln's 32.32% in California in 1860.

Results

Results by county

See also
 United States presidential elections in Idaho

References

Idaho
1912
1912 Idaho elections